Saint-Martin-Osmonville is a commune in the Seine-Maritime department in the Normandy region in northern France.

The inhabitants of the town of Saint-Martin-Osmonville are called Saint-Martinais, Saint-Martinaises in French.

Geography
Junction 11 of the A29 autoroute with the A28 autoroute forms much of the northwest border of the commune.

Population

Places of interest
 The church of St. Martin, dating from the fifteenth century.
 The thirteenth-century church of St. Martin in the hamlet of La Prée.

See also
Communes of the Seine-Maritime department

References

Communes of Seine-Maritime